Sarmaj may refer to:
 Sarmaj-e Hoseynkhani
 Sarmaj-e Karami